Bastilla maturata is a moth of the family Erebidae first described by Francis Walker in 1858. It is found in the north-eastern parts of the Himalayas, southern China, Japan, Thailand, Peninsular Malaysia, Sumatra and Borneo.

References

External links

Bastilla (moth)
Moths of Asia
Moths of Japan
Moths described in 1858